Gamaredon, also known as Primitive Bear and Actinium (by Microsoft) is a Russian advanced persistent threat that has been active since at least 2013.

Motivation
Cyber espionage appears to be the main goal of the group,; unlike most APTs, Gamaredon broadly targets all users all over the globe (in addition to also focusing on certain victims, especially Ukrainian organizations) and appears to provide services for other APTs. For example, the InvisiMole threat group has attacked select systems that Gamaredon had earlier compromised and fingerprinted.

Tactics
The group frequently uses spear phishing techniques with malicious code attachments that download remote templates containing malware.

Malware used by the group includes Pterodo, PowerPunch, ObfuMerry, ObfuBerry, DilongTrash, DinoTrain, and DesertDown.

Ukraine

On 19 January 2022, they attempted to compromise a Western government entity in Ukraine.

See also
Cyberwarfare by Russia
Russian–Ukrainian cyberwarfare

References

Hacking in the 2010s
Hacking in the 2020s
Russian advanced persistent threat groups